Robergea is a genus of fungi within the family Stictidaceae.

The genus was circumscribed by Jean-Baptiste Henri Joseph Desmazières in Ann. Sci. Nat. Bot. ser.3, vol.8 on page 177 in 1847.

The genus name of Robergea is in honour of Michel Robert Roberge (1791–1864), who was a French botanist and mycologist. He taught as a teacher at various girls' schools in Caen.

Species
, the following species are accepted by Species Fungorum;
 Robergea cubicularis 
 Robergea pupula 
 Robergea unica 

Note; R. lageniformis  = Robergea cubicularis

References

External links

Ostropales
Lichen genera
Ostropales genera